Yvan Hilary Pierrot (23 May 1996 – 31 December 2015) was a Mauritian weightlifter. He competed in the men's +105 kg event at the 2015 African Games

Sporting career
Pierrot started lifting in 2010 at the age of 14. He earned his first gold medal  in 2013 at the Commonwealth Youth Championships. In 2013 he won Mauritian Junior Sportsman of the Year award. 
In 2015 he won silver medal at the Commonwealth Championships, also he won gold medal at the junior category. At the African Games he won two bronze medal (clean & jerk, total) at +105 kg category.

Major Results

Death
On New Year's Eve afternoon, 2015, he was driving home alone, and suffered a fatal car accident at the Midlands.

References 

1996 births
2015 deaths
Mauritian male weightlifters
Road incident deaths in Mauritius
African Games bronze medalists for Mauritius
African Games medalists in weightlifting
People from Flacq District
Competitors at the 2015 African Games